On the Double may refer to:

On the Double (film), a 1961 film starring Danny Kaye
On the Double (album), a 1969 double album by Golden Earring
"On the Double", by Snoop Dogg from 220